Wisconsin Avenue Historic District may refer to:

Wisconsin Avenue Historic District (Neenah, Wisconsin), listed on the National Register of Historic Places in Winnebago County, Wisconsin
Wisconsin Avenue Historic District (Waukesha, Wisconsin), listed on the National Register of Historic Places in Waukesha County, Wisconsin